Maureen Elizabeth Edwards (born 17 April 1944) is a New Zealand-born actress, notable for her TV roles both locally and in Australia. 

Her best known soap opera roles include A Country Practice, Neighbours  (in 3 regular roles) and Shortland Street

She is probably best known internationally for her several cameo roles in cult series Prisoner

Biography

Theatre 
Edwards, born in New Zealand in April 1944, initially she trained to become a teacher, before becoming interested in theatre, in Dunedin, South Island she was featured actress at the Globe theatre in the 1960s and became an administrator for the gateway players theatre company. She emigrated to Australia with her husband Peter Tulloch in 1977

TV roles

As a character actress she became best known locally and internationally for her roles in the cult drama television series Prisoner, having portrayed 4 different characters in the series in cameos, although best known as Officer Sue Bailey,  

She remains best known for her roles in Australian television soap operas, particularly in the series A Country Practice as Matron Rosemary Prior from 1991 until 1993 (after two cameo roles in 1985 and 1990). She replaced hospital DN Ann Brennan (played by Mary Regan) and arrives from Africa to take over running the local hospital. In the series' final episode, Rosemary marries Dr. Terence Elliot (played by Shane Porteous).

In  Neighbours, Edwards played Ruby Dwyer in 2002 and 2003. She had appeared previously in Neighbours as Marcia Taylor in 1985 and later had 2 more roles in the series as Hilda Jones and Jill Smith in 2008 and 2009 respectively. 
 
She appeared in the New Zealand soap opera Shortland Street in 2001–2002 as CEO Dr. Patricia Hewitt.

Others - telemovies, miniseries and serials

She has featured in many Australia miniseries and telemovies such as All the Rivers Run and Evil Angels

Other television roles included the series Cop Shop, Skyways, I Can Jump Puddles, The Flying Doctors, G.P., Blue Heelers and The Secret Life of Us.

Filmography

References

External links

Australian film actresses
Australian soap opera actresses
New Zealand emigrants to Australia
20th-century Australian actresses
21st-century Australian actresses
1944 births
Living people